The 1991 NCAA Division I softball tournament was the tenth annual tournament to determine the national champion of NCAA women's collegiate softball. Held during May 1991, twenty Division I college softball teams contested the championship. The tournament featured eight regionals of either two or three teams, each in a double elimination format. The 1991 Women's College World Series was held in Oklahoma City, Oklahoma from May 23 through May 26 and marked the conclusion of the 1991 NCAA Division I softball season.  Arizona won their first championship by defeating three-time defending champions UCLA 5–1 in the final game.

Qualifying

Regionals

Regional No. 1

First elimination round
 1,  0
 3, Southwestern Louisiana 2
Florida State 2, Oklahoma State 0

Second elimination round

Florida State qualifies for WCWS, 3–0

Regional No. 2

UCLA qualifies for WCWS, 2–0

Regional No. 3

First elimination round
 3,  1
 3, Connecticut 0
UNLV 4, UMass 0

Second elimination round

UNLV qualifies for WCWS, 3–0

Regional No. 4

Arizona qualifies for WCWS, 2–0

Regional No. 5

Long Beach State qualifies for WCWS, 2–1

Regional No. 6

First elimination round
 2,  0
 2, Southern Illinois 0
Missouri 2, Iowa 0

Second elimination round

Missouri qualifies for WCWS, 3–0

Regional No. 7

Fresno State qualifies for WCWS, 2–0

Regional No. 8

First elimination round
 1,  0
Minnesota 3, 
Texas A&M 1, Utah 0
Utah 2, Minnesota 0

Second elimination round

Utah qualifies for WCWS, 3–1

Women's College World Series

Participants
Arizona

UCLA

Game results

Bracket

Championship Game

All-Tournament Team
The following players were named to the All-Tournament Team

See also
Women's College World Series
NCAA Division II Softball Championship
NCAA Division III Softball Championship
College World Series

References

1991 NCAA Division I softball season
NCAA Division I softball tournament